Ampress Works Halt was a halt station on the Lymington Branch Line which, between 1956 and 1989, served the Wellworthy engineering works near Lymington in Hampshire, England. Sited near the bridge over the A337 Lymington to Brockenhurst road, the station closed when the engineering works ceased operation. The station never appeared in any public timetable.

History
Opened by the Southern Region of British Railways in 1956, the station was served by Network SouthEast from the introduction of sectorisation until its closure. Constructed of concrete with chain-link fencing, it never appeared in any timetables and its demise came with the closure of the Wellworthy factory in 1989.

The site today
Trains on the electrified Lymington branch line still pass the site. However, as of June 2006 the new Lymington New Forest Hospital is being built on part of the old Wellworthy site, and the town of Lymington has also grown northwards to surround the location. The idea of reopening the halt, which still physically exists, has been discussed.

The station's former sign now hangs on the wall of the train shed at Eastleigh Lakeside Railway at the Lakeside Country Park.

References

Sources 
 
 
 Station on navigable O.S. map. Station site is south of main road near Ampress Farm

New Forest
Disused railway stations in Hampshire
Railway stations in Great Britain opened in 1956
Railway stations in Great Britain closed in 1989
Railway stations opened by British Rail
Lymington